The 1901 college football season had no clear-cut champion, with NCAA-designated "major selectors" retroactively selecting Michigan and Harvard as national champions. The NCAA records book also erroneously lists Yale as Parke H. Davis's selection. Harvard beat Yale 22–0 the last game of the year.

Conference and program changes

Rose Bowl 

The very first collegiate football bowl game was played following the 1901 season. Originally titled the "Tournament East-West football game" what is now known as the Rose Bowl Game was first played on January 1, 1902, in Pasadena, California. Michigan defeated Stanford 49–0.

Conference standings

Major conference standings

Independents

Minor conferences

Awards and honors

All-Americans

The consensus All-America team included:

Statistical leaders
Player scoring most points: Bruce Shorts, Michigan, 123
Rushing leader: Willie Heston, Michigan, 684
Rushing avg. leader: Willie Heston, 10.2
Rushing touchdowns leader: Willie Heston, 20

References